Academie de Foot Amadou Diallo de Djékanou also known as AFAD Djékanou is an Ivorian football club based in Abidjan.

Honours
Côte d'Ivoire Premier Division: 0
Runners-up (2): 2011, 2012.

Coupe de la Ligue de Côte d'Ivoire: 1
 2018.

Performance in CAF competitions
CAF Champions League: 2 appearances
2012 – Second Round
2013 – First Round

CAF Confederation Cup: 1 appearance
2012 – Second Round of 16

Current squad

External links
 Official site

Football clubs in Ivory Coast
Football clubs in Abidjan
2005 establishments in Ivory Coast
Sports clubs in Ivory Coast
Association football clubs established in 2005